SYP is the ISO code for the Syrian Pound.

SYP or Syp may also refer to:

Organizations
 Saskatchewan Youth Parliament
 Scottish Youth Parliament
 Socialist Unity Party (Finland) (1946–1955)
 Society of Young Publishers, in Britain
 South Yorkshire Police

Places and facilities
 Syp, a river in Perm Krai, Russia
 SYP, IATA code for Ruben Cantu Airport in Panama
 Sai Ying Pun station, a railway station in Hong Kong

Other uses
 Southern Yellow pine, several related species of tree found in the southern United States
 SYP, GHNC symbol for Synaptophysin, a human protein

See also